Vincent Burgio (born in Kansas City, Missouri) is an American professional poker player based in West Hills, California.

Burgio is a graduate of the University of Missouri. He moved to California in 1976 to set up a construction business and began playing poker tournaments regularly in 1987.

Burgio came to note as the winner of the Best All-Around Player Award at the 1992 Four Queens Poker Classic.

In 1994 he won a WSOP bracelet in the Seven-Card Stud Hi-Lo event, defeating a final table including both Howard "The Professor" Lederer and Jay Heimowitz. Burgio also made the final table of the $10,000 no limit hold'em main event that year, finishing in 4th place. He also finished in the money of the Main Event in 1998.

Burgio has made one World Poker Tour (WPT) final table, finishing 5th in the first season Gold Rush event won by Paul "The Truth" Darden.

Burgio has also competed in numerous events of the Ultimate Poker Challenge and has won 2 events.

As of 2011, his total live tournament winnings exceed $2,100,000.  His 28 cashes at the World Series of Poker account for $568,993 of his total tournament earnings.

Burgio writes a regular human interest article for CardPlayer Magazine which has led to him being called the "Andy Rooney of Poker". He has authored his autobiography entitled Pizza, Pasta and Poker: The Private & Public Life of a Professional Poker Player.

He is married with four grown daughters.

References

 Poker Aces by Ron Rose

External links
 Official site

American poker players
American gambling writers
American male non-fiction writers
Year of birth missing (living people)
World Series of Poker bracelet winners
Living people
University of Missouri alumni
People from West Hills, Los Angeles